The Piast Concept is a political idea of Polish state based on its initial territories under the Piast dynasty, containing a mostly Polish population. It holds that Poland, composed of mostly Polish territories in the west during Middle Ages, was a strong westernized state, equal to other western European countries. 

For its supporters, the Piast concept is mostly identified with the idea of westernization, attachment to Europe and its ideas, close relationship with western countries, and pragmatism in international relations, while avoiding unwise adventures in the East.

Development of the Piast Concept 
Jan Poplawski developed the "Piast Concept" in the 1890s. It formed the centerpiece of Polish nationalist ideology, especially as presented by the National Democracy Party, known as the "Endecja", which was led by Roman Dmowski. The concept was also supported by Polish peasant parties. In practice, Polish nationalists of the early 20th century believed that Poland should restore its central values such as westernization, focus on the development of Polish trade and economy and creation of a Polish middle class.

Rival Jagiellon Concept
A rival Jagiellon Concept was endorsed by the interwar governments dominated by Józef Piłsudski. It looked to the grandeur of Poland under the Jagiellonian dynasty in the later Middle Ages, which linked Poland–Lithuania, Bohemia, and Hungary under Polish kings. The Jagiellon Concept looked more to the underdeveloped eastern territories, inhabited mostly by Ukrainians, Lithuanians and Belarusians.

Supporters of the Piast Concept critiqued the Jagiellon Concept for neglecting the interests of the Polish population in the west, in particular by focusing on underdeveloped agricultural territories instead of industrial regions. Piast Concept supporters also argued that Jagiellon Concept put Poland unnecessarily at odds with the powerful Russian state, while ignoring the threat from Germany, which was considered far more dangerous in its ability to eradicate Polish identity than Russia. Since Jagiellonian Poland ultimately led to Poland being extinguished from the international arena, it was not seen as an attractive model to follow by the followers of the Piast Concept.

After 1940
Joseph Stalin at the 1943 Tehran Conference discussed with Winston Churchill and Franklin Roosevelt new post-war borders in central-eastern Europe, including the shape of future Poland. He endorsed the Piast Concept in order to justify a massive postwar shift of Poland's frontiers to the west. After discussions over many months Britain and the United States agreed with Stalin on the new borders, but the Polish government-in-exile remained opposed.

After 1945 the Communist government adopted the Piast Concept, using it to support their claim that they were champions of Polish national interests Calling the newly acquired formerly German territory "Recovered Territories", the Communist regime made an enormous effort to justify the acquisition in terms of the Piast Concept.

Following the removal of the Communist regime, Poland pursued a western-orientated foreign policy, in line with the ideas of the Piast Concept.

Criticism
Hosking and Schöpflin argue that the Piast Concept "rested on a simple and persuasive historical myth". They summarize the essence of this "myth" as follows:

Historian Norman Davies says that Dmowski based his vision of Poland on the "primitive" Piast period, "uncorrupted by alien influence".

Notes

1. Ewolucja systemu politycznego w Polsce w latach 1914-1998. T. 1. Odbudowanie niepodległego państwa i jego rozwój do 1945 r. Cz. 1, Zbiór studiów 1999. Polska myśl zachodnia XIX I XX wieku Czubiński Antoni

Political history of Poland
Polish nationalism (1795–1918)
Second Polish Republic